The Cambro was a very basic British three-wheeled, single-seat cyclecar made in 1920 and 1921 by the Central Aircraft Company of Northolt, Middlesex.

History
The car was designed by magazine editor F.J. Camm and G.A. Broomfield and powered by an air-cooled Johnson 192 cc two-stroke flat twin engine, driving the single rear wheel by a chain. The engine was more commonly found in outboard motors and mopeds. There was no reverse, but a free wheel mechanism was fitted to help manoeuvring the machine by hand.

The Cambro weighed 165lbs, was advertised as the cheapest car in the world, costing only 79 guineas (GBP83). The number made is not known.

See also
 List of car manufacturers of the United Kingdom

References

External links
The Johnson engine
Photo of George Broomfield's Cambro

Cyclecars
Defunct motor vehicle manufacturers of England
Cars introduced in 1920